= Service Objects =

- Company type: Private
- Industry: Data validation
- Founded: 2001
- Founder: Geoffrey Grow
- Key people: Geoffrey Grow (CEO)
- Website: www.serviceobjects.com

Service Objects is a contact and data validation company.

== Operations ==
Service Objects provides multiple address verification products and email validation services via batch or real-time API.

In 2013, the company launched the DOTS Address Validation-US3 API, which automatically verifies, corrects, and appends address information to contact data records in real time. The DOTS Address Validation-US3 API utilizes the USPS CASS-certified address engine of over 165 million addresses to validate and cleanse addresses by correcting typos and filling in missing information. The API also appends addresses with carrier route and barcode digits for sorting and delivery.
